Igor Lukes (born 1950) is a professor of history at Boston University, who focuses on central European history since World War I. He is also an Honorary Consul General of the Czech Republic.

Works

The Munich Crisis, 1938: Prelude to World War II. Psychology Press. 1999.

References

Living people
Historians of the Czech Republic
Boston University faculty
Czechoslovak emigrants to the United States
1950 births